Terran Sandwith (born April 17, 1972) is a Canadian former professional ice hockey defenceman who played eight games in the National Hockey League (NHL) for the Edmonton Oilers during the 1997–98 season.

Bio
Sandwith was born in Edmonton, Alberta. He started his junior career with the Tri-City Americans in the WHL, steadily improving his point totals in three seasons with the team.  For the 1991–92 season, Sandwith split time with the Brandon Wheat Kings and the Saskatoon Blades. He totalled 27 points to go along with 198 penalty minutes. He was selected in the second round of the 1990 NHL Entry Draft, 42nd overall, by the Philadelphia Flyers.

Having never played a game with Philadelphia, Sandwith signed with the Edmonton Oilers as a free agent in April 1996. He made his NHL debut during the 1997-98 season with Edmonton. He later played in the minor leagues for the Anaheim Ducks and Toronto Maple Leafs organizations.

In 1995, Sandwith played with RHI's Los Angeles Blades, totalling 11 points in 11 games.

Sandwith is president of GS Construction in Spruce Grove, Alberta.

Career statistics

External links

1972 births
Living people
Belfast Giants players
Brandon Wheat Kings players
Canadian ice hockey defencemen
Cape Breton Oilers players
Cincinnati Mighty Ducks players
Edmonton Oilers players
Hamilton Bulldogs (AHL) players
Hershey Bears players
Houston Aeros (1994–2013) players
Ice hockey people from Edmonton
Jokerit players
Kansas City Blades players
Philadelphia Flyers draft picks
St. John's Maple Leafs players
Saskatoon Blades players
Tri-City Americans players
Los Angeles Blades players
Canadian expatriate ice hockey players in Northern Ireland
Canadian expatriate ice hockey players in Finland
Canadian expatriate ice hockey players in Austria
Canadian expatriate ice hockey players in the United States